Alma Eufrosyne Jokinen (née Malander; 28 April 1882 - 1939) was a Finnish politician, born in Tampere. She was a member of the Parliament of Finland from 1908 to 1918, representing the Social Democratic Party of Finland (SDP). In 1918, during the Finnish Civil War, she sided with the Reds. When the Finnish Socialist Workers' Republic collapsed, she fled to Soviet Russia. She settled later in Petrozavodsk, in the Karelian ASSR, where she died in 1939. She was married to Väinö E. Jokinen, who was killed in 1920 during the Kuusinen Club Incident in Petrograd.

References

1882 births
1939 deaths
Politicians from Tampere
People from Häme Province (Grand Duchy of Finland)
Social Democratic Party of Finland politicians
Members of the Parliament of Finland (1908–09)
Members of the Parliament of Finland (1909–10)
Members of the Parliament of Finland (1910–11)
Members of the Parliament of Finland (1911–13)
Members of the Parliament of Finland (1913–16)
Members of the Parliament of Finland (1916–17)
Members of the Parliament of Finland (1917–19)
People of the Finnish Civil War (Red side)
20th-century Finnish women politicians
Women members of the Parliament of Finland